Sez Les is a British sketch comedy show that starred Les Dawson. It was produced by Yorkshire Television, and aired on ITV from 1969 to 1976. Les Dawson and Roy Barraclough (who was a cast member from series four onward) regularly performed together as the characters Cissie and Ada. John Cleese appeared in a few sketches in series 3 and appeared regularly in series 8 and 9. Other cast members included Norman Chappell, Brian Glover, Brian Murphy, and Kathy Staff. Music for series 1-5 and 7-8 was provided by Syd Lawrence and his orchestra.

Currently on sky channel 187 (That's TV)
March 2022

Cast

Broadcast history
According to Barfe and IMDb, the broadcast episodes were as follows:

 Series 1: 6x30 min, 30 April-18 June 1969.
 Series 2: 6x30 min, 10 September-19 November 1969.
 Series 3: 4x30 min, 16 August-6 September 1971.
 Series 4: 6x30 min, 13 January-17 February 1972.
 Series 5: 7x45 min, 29 July-9 September 1972.
 Series 6: 6x30 min, 30 October-4 December 1972.
 Series 7: 7x45 min, 28 July-8 September 1973.
 Series 8: 7x45 min, 25 January-8 March 1974.
 Series 9: 7x30 min, 28 June-9 August 1974.
 Series 10: 4x60 min, 2 January, 25 February-10 March 1976.
 Series 11: 7x30 min, 19 October-30 November 1976

All of series 1 and episodes 1-5 of series 2 were made in black and white. All others were made in colour. Timings are given including advertising breaks: the actual running times are several minutes shorter.

Most episodes followed a 'variety' format, including musical and dance numbers with various musical guests. An exception is Series 6, which although treated by IMDb and video label Network as part of the series, bears a different title, Les Sez and consists only of comic sketches and standup. Series 11 also lacks musical and dance items.

Most episodes were directed by David Mallet, later a prominent director of music videos. The exceptions were Series 6, directed by Bill Hitchcock, and Series 10-11, directed by Vernon Lawrence.

A Christmas special aired in 1973, and a New Year special in 1976.

All episodes of series one and two are missing, and are believed to have been wiped. The remaining episodes survive in the archive and have been released on DVD by Network.

Video releases
 Sez Les, Volume 1 (October 2008), series three and four 
 Sez Les, Volume 2 (25 May 2009), series five and six 
 Sez Les, Volume 3 (8 February 2010), series seven and eight, plus the 1973 Christmas special 
 Sez Les, Volume 4 (7 May 2012), series nine, ten, and eleven, plus the 1976 New Year special

References

External links
 Sez Les at the BFI Film & TV Database

1969 British television series debuts
1976 British television series endings
1960s British television sketch shows
1970s British television sketch shows
ITV sketch shows
Television series by Yorkshire Television
English-language television shows